Sascha Mockenhaupt (born 10 September 1991) is a German professional footballer who plays as a defender for SV Wehen Wiesbaden. He is also a professional FIFA esports player.

Career statistics

References

External links
 

Living people
1991 births
Association football defenders
German footballers
2. Bundesliga players
3. Liga players
Regionalliga players
Eliteserien players
1. FC Kaiserslautern II players
1. FC Kaiserslautern players
VfR Aalen players
FK Bodø/Glimt players
SV Wehen Wiesbaden players
German expatriate footballers
German expatriate sportspeople in Norway
Expatriate footballers in Norway